Holger Klose (born 5 December 1972 in Bitburg, Rhineland-Palatinate) is a retired male hammer thrower from Germany. His personal best throw is 82.22 metres, achieved in May 1998 in Dortmund. This ranks him fifth among German hammer throwers, behind Ralf Haber, Heinz Weis, Karsten Kobs and Günther Rodehau. Klose represented Eintracht Frankfurt.

International competitions

References

External links

1972 births
Living people
People from Bitburg
German male hammer throwers
World Athletics Championships athletes for Germany
Eintracht Frankfurt athletes
Sportspeople from Rhineland-Palatinate